The 1947–48 Montreal Canadiens season was the 39th season in club history. The team finished fifth, four points out of a playoff spot, their last time missing the playoffs until 1970.

Regular season
Bill Durnan was the last goaltender in the 20th Century to serve as Captain of an NHL team. He suffered his only losing season during the 1947–48 season, and, for the only time in his career, did not lead the league in goals against average.

Final standings

Record vs. opponents

Schedule and results

Player statistics

Regular season
Scoring

Goaltending

Playoffs
Scoring

Goaltending

Awards and records
 Elmer Lach, Art Ross Trophy
 Elmer Lach, Center, NHL First Team All-Star
 Ken Reardon, Defense, NHL Second Team All-Star
 Maurice Richard, Right Wing, NHL First Team All-Star

References
Canadiens on Hockey Database
Canadiens on NHL Reference

Montreal Canadiens seasons
Montreal
Montreal
Montreal Canadiens
Montreal Canadiens